Besnik Krasniqi (born 1 February 1990 in Pristina) is a Kosovar professional footballer who plays as a right back for Drita in the Kosovo Superleague.

Career
Krasniqi joined newly promoted Albanian Superliga side Partizani Tirana in June 2013.

He joined Teuta Durrës ahead of the 2014–15 season as a free agent, and he made 15 league appearances, scoring one goal, as well featuring in 3 cup games before leaving the club in January 2015 to return to Kosovo. He signed a 6-month contract with KF Istogu in the Football Superleague of Kosovo in January 2015, and he scored 5 goals in 13 league games as he helped the club avoid the relegation play-offs. He left the club at the end of the season to return to Albania.

Krasniqi joined newly promoted Albanian Superliga side Bylis Ballsh just before the start of the 2015–16 season.

References

1990 births
Living people
Sportspeople from Pristina
Association football fullbacks
Kosovan footballers
FC Prishtina players
FK Partizani Tirana players
KF Teuta Durrës players
SC Gjilani players
KF Flamurtari players
KF Feronikeli players
KF Llapi players
KF Vëllaznimi players
KF Ballkani players
Football Superleague of Kosovo players
Kategoria Superiore players